The Canon PowerShot S is a series of digital cameras released by Canon, as part of the wider PowerShot range. The S-series was originally a line of compact point-and-shoot cameras, slowly evolving into a prosumer line of cameras slotting right beneath the G-series cameras. The line later branched off into Canon's line of super-zoom cameras. The PowerShot ELPH line is a branch of the S-series, due to its model number designations in the United States (with the S- and SD- prefixes), as well as the similarities between the PowerShot ELPH S100 and the PowerShot S10

G-series in a compact body 
From the PowerShot S90 onwards the S-series continues a line of Canon compact digital cameras that commenced with the Ixus 900Ti and feature the Digic image processors and larger than average sensors as fitted to the advanced PowerShot G-series cameras. The Ixus / S-series and the equivalent G-series models are listed below:

 Ixus 900Ti (SD900)* / PowerShot G7 / Digic III / 10MP 3648 × 2736 1/1.8″ CCD.
 Ixus 960IS (SD950IS)* / PowerShot G9 / Digic III / 12.1MP 4000 × 3000 1/1.7″ CCD.
 Ixus 980IS (SD990IS) / PowerShot G10 / Digic 4 / 14.7MP 4416 × 3312 1/1.7″ CCD.
 PowerShot S90, S95, S200 / PowerShot G11, G12 / Digic 4 / 10MP 3648 × 2736 1/1.7″ CCD (S200 features Digic 5).
 PowerShot S100, S110 / PowerShot G15 / Digic 5 / 12.1MP 4000×3000 1/1.7" CMOS.
 Powershot S120 / PowerShot G16 / Digic 6 / 12.1MP 4000×3000 1/1.7" CMOS.

(* The Ixus 900Ti and 960IS feature a titanium body.)

Models

Compact S series 
The Sxx series is made up of two sub-series. The S10 and S20 were compact point-and-shoot cameras, while the S30-onwards were prosumer digital cameras that were the de-contented, lower-cost alternative to the equivalent G-series camera at the time.

Super Zoom S/SX series 
The S1 to SX70 series consists of ultra-zoom cameras, having longer zoom ranges and a more extensive list of features. The SX100 and later SX models are a more compact, affordable spin-off. The "SX" stands for "Super Zoom." All S and SX models feature image stabilization, and most have full manual controls.

See also 
 Canon PowerShot
 Canon PowerShot A
 Canon PowerShot G
 Canon PowerShot SD or Digital Elph

References

External links 
 

S
Superzoom cameras
Year of introduction missing